Scrapbook may refer to:

 Scrapbooking, the process of making a scrapbook

Software
 Scrapbook, an early (1970s) information storage and retrieval system 
 Scrapbook (Mac OS), a Mac OS application
 ScrapBook, a Firefox extension

Film and TV
 Scrapbook (film), American horror film 2000
 Scrapbook, American comedy film with Eric Balfour 1999

Music
 Scrapbook, album by Captain & Tennille 1999
 Scrapbook (album), an album by William Parker's Violin Trio 2003
 Scrapbook (Portastatic EP)
 Scrapbook (The Limousines EP)

Literature
 Scrap Book (diary), diary written by Indian writer Govardhanram Tripathi

Radio
 Scrapbook for 19.., an occasional programme on the BBC Home Service

See also
 Book (disambiguation)